Jali Mäkilä (born: 22 April 1965 Turku) is a sailor from Finland, who represented his country at the 2000 Summer Olympics in Sydney, Australia as helmsman in the Soling. With crew members Eki Heinonen and Sami Tamminen they took the 15th place.

References

1965 births
Living people
Finnish male sailors (sport)
Sailors at the 1992 Summer Olympics – Finn
Sailors at the 1996 Summer Olympics – Finn
Sailors at the 2000 Summer Olympics – Soling
Olympic sailors of Finland
Sportspeople from Turku